Le Battant is a 1983 French crime thriller film starring and directed by Alain Delon.

It recorded admissions of 1,935,094 in France.

Plot
Jacques Darnay is released from prison after eight years and tries to recover a cache of stolen diamonds. He is confronted in his quest by both the police and rival criminals.

Cast 
 Alain Delon as Jacques Darnay
 François Périer  as Gino Ruggieri
 Pierre Mondy  as Rouxel
 Anne Parillaud  as Nathalie
 Andréa Ferréol  as Sylviane Chabry
 Marie-Christine Descouard  as Clarisse
 Michel Beaune  as Pierre Mignot
 Gérard Hérold  as Sauvat
 Jean-François Garreaud  as Pradier
 Richard Anconina  as Samatan
 Philippe Castelli  as Nestor

Reception
The film had 1,935,094 admissions in France and ranked 31st in the year of 1983.

Roy Armes wrote that "the limply written plot... never begins to create the requisite suspense and the wooden narcissism of the producer-star... merely serves as a reminder of how much livelier French cinema was before its stars achieved their present predominance."

References

External links

1983 films
1980s crime thriller films
French crime thriller films
Films about murder
Alain Delon
1980s French films